Gemini is a  twin-peaked mountain summit located west of the crest of the Sierra Nevada mountain range in Fresno County of northern California, United States. It is situated in the John Muir Wilderness, on land managed by Sierra National Forest. Gemini ranks as the 176th-highest summit in California.

History

The first ascent of the summit was made July 30, 1953, by Jim Koontz and Rosemarie Lenel. The mountain's name was suggested by Chester Versteeg, a prominent Sierra Club mountaineer from Los Angeles. The peak's name was officially adopted in 1954 by the U.S. Board on Geographic Names and promulgated in 1957. Today this peak draws climbing interest because it is included on the Sierra Peaks Section's peak bagging list.

Climate
According to the Köppen climate classification system, Gemini is located in an alpine climate zone. Most weather fronts originate in the Pacific Ocean, and travel east toward the Sierra Nevada mountains. As fronts approach, they are forced upward by the peaks, causing them to drop their moisture in the form of rain or snowfall onto the range (orographic lift). Precipitation runoff from this mountain drains into tributaries of the South Fork San Joaquin River.

See also

List of mountain peaks of California

References

External links
 Weather forecast: Gemini

Sierra National Forest
Mountains of Fresno County, California
Mountains of the John Muir Wilderness
North American 3000 m summits
Mountains of Northern California
Sierra Nevada (United States)